Best Collaboration (最優秀コラボレーションビデオ賞)

Results
The following table displays the nominees and the winners in bold print with a yellow background.

2000s

2010s

Musical collaboration awards

id:MTV Video Music Awards untuk Best Collaboration